The 1962 Wichita Shockers football team was an American football team that represented Wichita  University (now known as Wichita State University) as a member of the Missouri Valley Conference during the 1962 NCAA University Division football season. In its first season under head coach Marcelino Huerta, the team compiled a 3–7 record (0–3 against conference opponents), finished in last place out of four teams in the MVC, and was outscored by a total of 139 to 127. The team played its home games at Veterans Field, now known as Cessna Stadium. Pro Football Hall of Fame coach Bill Parcells was a junior linebacker on the team.

Schedule

References

Wichita
Wichita State Shockers football seasons
Wichita Shockers football